Fifteen Minutes may refer to:

 Fifteen Minutes: A Tribute to The Velvet Underground, a 1994 Velvet Underground cover album by various artists
 Andy Warhol's Fifteen Minutes, a television show

 "Fifteen Minutes" (The Green Green Grass), a 2007 episode of the British television show
 "Fifteen Minutes", a song by Telepopmusik from the album Angel Milk, 2005

See also
 15 Minutes (disambiguation)